SM U-80 was one of the 329 submarines serving in the Imperial German Navy in World War I.
U-80 was engaged in the naval warfare and took part in the First Battle of the Atlantic.

She struck two mines laid by U-80 off Malin Head, and sank within one hour. She went down with 345 casualties, and 35 tons of gold ingots.

U-80 was surrendered to the Allies at Harwich on 16 January 1919 in accordance with the requirements of the Armistice with Germany. She was sold by the British Admiralty to George Cohen on 3 March 1919 for £2,300 (excluding engines), and was broken up at Swansea.

Design
German Type UE I submarines were preceded by the longer Type U 66 submarines. U-80 had a displacement of  when at the surface and  while submerged. The submarine was powered by two  engines for use while surfaced, and two  engines for use while submerged. She had two propeller shafts.

U-80 was fitted with two  torpedo tubes (one at the port bow and one starboard stern), four torpedoes, and one  SK L/30 deck gun. She had a complement of thirty-two (twenty-eight crew members and four officers).

Summary of raiding history

References

Notes

Citations

Bibliography

World War I submarines of Germany
1916 ships
U-boats commissioned in 1916
Ships built in Hamburg
German Type UE I submarines